The Jangchung Arena is an indoor sporting arena located in Jung District, Seoul, South Korea. Volleyball teams GS Caltex Seoul KIXX and Seoul Woori Card WooriWON are the tenants.

History

At first, the arena was an army gymnasium, built on 23 June 1955. It was later fully reconstructed and opened on 1 February 1963. In 1966, the venue hosted a boxing match between Kim Ki-soo and Nino Benvenuti, where Kim became the first South Korean to win the boxing world championships. During the 1970s, the venue hosted the presidential elections and inaugurations of Park Chung-hee and Choi Kyu-hah. The venue hosted judo and taekwondo events at the 1988 Summer Olympics. After the 2012–2014 renovation, the capacity of the arena is 4,507.

Transport connections

Metro
The stadium is accessible from the Seoul Metropolitan Subway. The closest station to the stadium is Dongguk University Exit 5, on Line 3, located 180 meters from the stadium.

Bus
The bus lines with a stop close to Jangchung Gymnasium:
 7212 – Eunpyeong Garage/Oksu-Dong
 6211 – Sinweol-Dong/Sangwangshimni Station
 2233 – Myeonmok-Dong/Oksu-Dong
 144 – Ui-Dong/Seoul National University of Education
 301 – Jangji Garage/Hyehwa-Dong

FIVB Volleyball World League
The arena was one of the venues at the 2016 and 2017 editions of the FIVB Volleyball World League, and held the following matches:

2016 FIVB Volleyball World League

|}

2017 FIVB Volleyball World League

|}

See also 
 List of indoor arenas in South Korea

References

External links 

  
  

Jung District, Seoul
Venues of the 1988 Summer Olympics
Olympic judo venues
Olympic taekwondo venues
Indoor arenas in South Korea
Sports venues in Seoul
Sports venues completed in 1963
1955 establishments in Korea